Serangoon Stadium is a multi-purpose stadium in Serangoon, Singapore.  

It is located at 33 Yio Chu Kang Road, Singapore 545677. It has a seating capacity of 1,200. 
It was built in 1993 and opened to the public on 1 March 1994. 

The stadium is open to the public for recreational activities. Many events had been organized in the stadium since its opening.

History 
In 2015, the Football Association of Singapore opened its third Grassroots Football Training Centre at Serangoon Stadium.

Major Events
One of the recent most important event is the Workers' Party (WP) rallies that were held in the 2006, 2011, and 2015 general elections for the Aljunied GRC constituency.

References

Sports venues in Singapore
Football venues in Singapore
Buildings and structures in Serangoon
Multi-purpose stadiums in Singapore